Harriet E. Garrison (October 20, 1848 – October 3, 1930) was an American physician and medical writer whose practice was based in Dixon, Illinois. She traveled widely and wrote on medical topics, presenting papers at medical conferences.

Early life and education
Harriet E. Garrison was born on a farm in Dixon, Illinois, October 20, 1848. Her parents were William Garrison and Amelia (Oman) Garrison, prosperous farmers of that county. The parent were born, reared and married in Luzerne County, Pennsylvania, when they emigrated to Lee County, Illinois. There, the father followed farming for some years, but spent his last days in retirement from active labor, near Dixon, in Nachusa township, where both he and his wife died and were buried. In their family were nine children, including: George, Hannah, Martha, Peter, John, Harriet, William, Mamie, and Hester. The family home, located three miles east of Dixon, was known as the Big Spring Farm. It was the first land bought by William Garrison in the fall of 1845, when it was wild prairie land. He built a two story and basement brick house facing the spring.

Garrison passed her girlhood becoming skillful in domestic pursuits. For many years, she enjoyed finding a quiet nook and reading a book. Until fourteen years of age, the district school furnished her with an education. She then entered the Dixon Seminary, where she spent four months. Part of her education occurred at Rock River Seminary, at Mount Morris, Ogle county, Illinois.

It was at this institution that she evinced an aptitude for understanding the mechanism of the human body. Before, in fact, she had become a student of anatomy and physiology, her teacher advised her to adopt medicine as a life work. At the conclusion of her course in these branches, she had achieved the record of standing perfect through the entire term. But although her parents were financially well off, when she had attained her majority, preferred to teach rather than depend upon them to provide her with financial means for a collegiate education. Subsequently, she engaged in various dairy industries, without losing sight of her ultimate ambition. During these years of farm life, Garrison's butter became one of the notable products of the village.

In 1872, she entered the medical office of Dr. John Williamson, of Dixon, as a student, and two years later, Garrison matriculated at the Woman's Hospital Medical College of Chicago (later, Woman's Medical School of the Northwestern University, Chicago). At that time, the curriculum provided for but two courses of lectures so that Garrison graduated on February 29, 1876.

Career

Physician
Immediately after graduating, Garrison was requested to go to Franklin Grove, Illinois, to take charge of a large local practice, which she managed successfully until the return of the owner. In October 1876, she returned to Dixon and began practice, building up day by day and gaining in public esteem, until she became one of the most prominent general practitioners in the city. Beginning when the city numbered about 2,500, she handled all the patient that came to her, driving night and day in country and town, taking the common as well as the uncommon things that were required, including major and minor surgery. From December 1890 till February 1891, Garrison removed to New York City to visit hospitals and take the post graduate course at the Post Graduate School of New York, thus improving her skills and becoming familiar with later devices and newer theories.

Garrison traveled extensively throughout the United States, having visited the points of principal interest from New York to California and to Florida. In 1897, her travels were extended to Europe, when she accompanied the delegates to the Twelfth International Medical congress (held in Moscow) through Italy, Switzerland, Germany, and Austria. Upon her return in that year, she delivered a lecture entitled "The Women I Met in Russia", before the students of the Steinmann Institute. In June 1900, she made plans to travel to Europe to visit the 1900 Paris Exposition and witness the Oberammergau Passion Play in the Bavarian Alps. She made an announcement in 1920, that after forty-four years of medical practice, she would specialize in the medical cure of goitre, asthma and beginning tuberculosis.

She was affiliated with the American Medical Association, the Illinois State Medical Society, and the North Central Illinois Society. Garrison mentored young women in the medical profession. At the 1899 annual alumni meeting of the Alumnae Association of the Woman's Medical School of the Northwestern University, Chicago, Garrison was elected vice-president of the organization.

Writer
Garrison's writings were highly valued and widely quoted in the medical journals of the day, the periodicals of New York, Philadelphia, Boston, Richard, Virginia, and other large cities welcoming her contributions.
Among her more prominent productions was a paper on "Scarlet Fever, treated with Antefebrin" (N. Y. Med. Record, October 22, 1892); "Some Clinical Reflections on the Treatment of Diphtheria" (Dietetic Gazette, February 1893); "Roseolo and Rothelin" (American Medico Surgical Bulletin, October 1894); "A Case of Exopthalmas in an Infant of Three Months", (The Journal of the American Medical Association, report of the proceedings of Paediatrics in the forty-fifth annual meeting); "Establishing a Practice" (The Woman Physician); and "Evolution of Girls", at the forty-seventh annual meeting of the American Medical Association, held at Atlanta, Georgia, the paper being published in the journal proceedings and meeting with general favor.

In 1899, Garrison received a personal request from Dr. Henry Tuley of Louisville, Kentucky, chairman of the Section of Diseases of Children, to read a paper at the meeting of the American Medical Association at Columbus, Ohio, as a delegate from the State Medical Society, upon her personal experience with the epidemic disease which had recently so closely simulated measles and scarlet fever, the title of the paper being "LaGrippe Exanthemata".

Personal life
Of civic societies, she was a member only of the Woman's Christian Temperance Union, dating her connection with this organization from 1876. As to religious affiliation, Garrison was a member of the Methodist Episcopal Church, as were her parents before her.

Garrison died October 3, 1930 and was buried in the Girton Cemetery, Lee County, Illinois.

References

Attribution

External links
 

1848 births
1930 deaths
People from Dixon, Illinois
Physicians from Illinois
American medical writers
19th-century American women physicians
19th-century American physicians
19th-century American women writers
Woman's Christian Temperance Union people
Writers from Illinois